Zawonie is a former village, currently on the terrain of Ukraine, in Chervonohrad Raion of Lviv Oblast. The village was situated on the edge of the forest east of Sosnivka and south-west of the Western Bug River.

Zawonie as an independent gmina (municipality) was created on 23 April 1930 in the Second Polish Republic. Before that it was a part of the gmina of Sielec Bełzki. Since 1934 the village belonged to the gmina of Parchacz in the powiat of Sokal in the Lwów Voivodeship. As a result of the Soviet invasion of Poland as part of the Second World War in September 1939, the eastern border of Poland was moved westward to the Bug and Solokiya Rivers, resulting in the village as well as the rest of the gnima of Parchacz now being located in the USSR. In 1941 the Germans took control of the area as part of their invasion of the Soviet Union.

The village ceased to exist on 6 March 1944 as a result of being burned to the ground during pacification actions in German-occupied Poland by Germans and Ukrainians.

References

External links
 University of Wrocław page about Zawonie (19 September 2011) (PL)
 Zawonie na mapie katastralnej (w:) Szukaj w archiwach (Szwa) PL/29/280/0/26.1/3200, Archiwum Narodowe w Krakowie (ANK=29), zespół archiwalny nr 280/0 Kataster galicyjski, seria 26.1 Kataster Żółkiew - mapy, jednostka archiwalna (sygnatura) nr 3200 Sielec z miejscowością Zawonie w Galicyi Powiat podatkowy Sokal, plik 11.jpg (PL)

Villages in Chervonohrad Raion
1944 in Ukraine